Skeletocutis falsipileata is a species of poroid crust fungus in the family Polyporaceae. Found in Malaysia, it was first described by E.J.H. Corner in 1992 as a species of Tyromyces. Tsutomu Hattori transferred it to Skeletocutis in 2002.

References

Fungi described in 1992
Fungi of Asia
falsipileata